"Boogie Shoes" is a funk/disco song by  KC and the Sunshine Band, which first appeared on their 1975 self-titled album. The song became a hit after it appeared on the Saturday Night Fever soundtrack in 1977. It was subsequently released as a single and peaked at number 35 on the Billboard Hot 100 and number 29 on the soul chart in 1978. Before its 1978 release as an A-side, the song was the B-side to the 1976 single "Shake Your Booty".

Structurally, it uses the sixteen-bar blues chord progression. As with several of KC's disco songs, some of the lyrics are playfully suggestive: "I want to do it till the sun comes up / I want to do it till I can't get enough."

In addition to Saturday Night Fever, the song is featured in numerous other films, including No Escape (1994), Mallrats (1995), Boogie Nights (1997), Detroit Rock City (1999), The Wedding Date (2005), Knock at the Cabin (2022) as well as the television series Sports Night, Desperate Housewives (both, coincidentally, with star Felicity Huffman dancing to it), Flash Forward, and Pose.

The song peaked at number 34 on the UK Singles Chart in the week of 6 May 1978 and was on the chart for a total of five weeks.

Covers and sampling
The song has been sampled by the Bloodhound Gang in the song "One Way" and by Trick Daddy in the song "Take It to da House". Alex Chilton covered "Boogie Shoes" on his 1979 album Like Flies on Sherbert. In 2012, the song was sung by Alex Newell (playing a transgender teen) in the Glee episode "Saturday Night Glee-ver".

Personnel
Harry Wayne Casey – keyboards, vocals
Jerome Smith – guitar
Richard Finch – bass guitar
Robert Johnson – drums
Oliver C. Brown – percussion
Ken Faulk – trumpet
Vinnie Tanno – trumpet
Mike Lewis – tenor saxophone
Whit Sidener – baritone saxophone
Beverly Champion – background vocals
Margaret Reynolds – background vocals
Jeanette Williams – background vocals

Certifications

References

1975 songs
1978 singles
KC and the Sunshine Band songs
Boogie songs
Songs from Saturday Night Fever
Songs written by Harry Wayne Casey
Songs written by Richard Finch (musician)
TK Records singles